Boys' Byte CII class competition at the 2014 Summer Youth Olympics in Nanjing took place from August 18 to August 23 at Jinniu Lake. 30 sailors competed in this dinghy competition.

Eight races were scheduled.

Medalists

Results
 BYTE (MEN) OVERALL RESULTS

Notes
Scoring abbreviations are defined as follows:
 OCS – On the Course Side of the starting line
 DSQ – Disqualified
 DNF – Did Not Finish
 DNS – Did Not Start
 BFD – Black Flag Disqualification
 RAF – Retired after Finishing

References

 Fleet Overall

Sailing at the 2014 Summer Youth Olympics
Byte CII competitions